Begone Dull Care is the third studio album by Canadian electronic music group Junior Boys. The album was released on March 24, 2009 in Canada and on April 7, 2009 in the United States.

The album is named for Begone Dull Care, a short film by National Film Board animator Norman McLaren inspired by the music of Canadian jazz pianist Oscar Peterson, which influenced the album's conception and creation. The front cover gives the band name in French (albeit with the word "première" mistyped), along with Caprice en Couleurs, the French title of the film; the entirety of the liner notes is presented bilingually, including song titles.

Track listing

Charts

References 

2009 albums
Junior Boys albums
Domino Recording Company albums
Works based on films